The Château de Chaban, also Château de Chabans, is a château in Saint-Léon-sur-Vézère, Dordogne, Aquitaine, France.

Châteaux in Dordogne
Monuments historiques of Dordogne